"Knives and Pens" is a song by American rock band Black Veil Brides, released as a music video exclusively on YouTube. It is their first single, and is one of their most popular songs to date, with the music video reaching over 100 million views on YouTube.

Other versions 

The song was re-recorded and re-released as two new versions—a version with a few vocal and guitar changes, and a limited edition Hot Topic acoustic version—alongside the songs "We Stitch These Wounds" and "The Mortician's Daughter" on their debut studio album, We Stitch These Wounds. The limited-copy acoustic version was re-released by StandBy Records to the general public for download on March 19, 2013.

Song information and background

Meaning behind "Knives and Pens" 
The lyrics were written by Black Veil Brides vocalist Andy Biersack around the title "Knives and Pens" which, according to him describes a choice: Knives — destruction (as in harming yourself), and Pens — creation (as in the choice he decided to make to begin writing music and make something of their life). Black Veil Brides is saying in this song that if you make good choices in life, you can rise above and conquer whatever troubles you may come across.

Intro clip 
The clip at the beginning of the original version of the song is from the documentary Paradise Lost: The Child Murders at Robin Hood Hills. It was taken from a recording of one of the West Memphis Three trials. The transcription of the clip is as follows:

Music video 
The official music video for the song was released on YouTube on June 17, 2009, directed by Patrick Fogarty, who later directed the "Perfect Weapon," "The Legacy," "Rebel Love Song," and "Coffin" music videos. The video stars actor David Sasik, who is playing the role of the kid resembling Andy. It was a very low-budget project, but despite this, the video launched the band into international fame. The official video has reached over 126 million views on YouTube as of December 16, 2020.

Video plot 
The music video depicts a scenario similar to Andy's years in school, where he was bullied for the way he dressed, looked and the music he listened to.

A boy walks to his school locker and sees papers taped to it that have hurtful messages written on them, such as "emo", "fag", and "kill yourself". He rips them down and throws them to the ground in anger. Even his brother bullies him, stealing his notebook that he writes lyrics inspired by his feelings of anger in. He goes home angry, but his brother eventually comes in and returns his notebook. He then proceeds to begin writing the lyrics to "Knives and Pens". He also is seen watching the video of Black Veil Brides playing the song and there are clips of the band playing with occasionally dressing in white and occasionally dressing in black.

Acoustic version video 
Black Veil Brides released a lyric video for the acoustic version of "Knives and Pens" on March 20, 2013, through StandBy Records

Track listing 
CD single [1st version]

CD single [2nd version]

Acoustic single

Personnel 
Black Veil Brides (studio band)
 Andy Biersack – lead vocals, keyboards
 Gianna Cianci - screaming, backing vocals
 
 
->Johnny Herold – lead guitar
 Nate Shipp – rhythm guitar, backing vocals
 Phil Cenedella – bass
 Chris "Craven" Riesenberg - drums

Music video band/production
 Andy Biersack – vocals
 Gianna Cianci - backing vocals
 Chris "Hollywood" Bluser – guitar
 Sandra Alvarenga – drums
 David Sasik – leading actor
 Patrick Fogarty – director

References

External links 
 
 

2009 songs
2013 singles
Black Veil Brides songs
Songs written by Andy Biersack